In music, the dominant scale is:

Mixolydian mode

Dominant scale may also refer to:
Phrygian dominant scale
Lydian dominant scale
altered dominant scale (a jazz scale), or
the bebop dominant scale